Turdo Vineyard & Winery is a winery in the North Cape May section of Lower Township in Cape May County, New Jersey. The vineyard was first planted in 1999, and opened to the public in 2004. Turdo has 5 acres of grapes under cultivation, and produces 1,100 cases of wine per year. The winery is named after the family that owns it.

Wines
Turdo Vineyards is in the Outer Coastal Plain AVA, and specializes in the use of Italian grapes. Wine is produced from Albariño, Barbera, Cabernet Sauvignon, Merlot, Nebbiolo, Nero d'Avola, Pinot gris, Pinot noir, Riesling, Sangiovese, Sauvignon blanc, and Syrah grapes. Turdo is best known for its signature Nero d'Avola wine, and is one of only two wineries in the United States that uses Nero d'Avola, which is a highly aromatic red vinifera grape indigenous to Sicily. Turdo sells its wine under the brands "Turis" and "DiLuca," which are named after the owner of the winery and his son.

Features, licensing, associations, and publicity
The entire winery facility is powered using solar energy. Turdo has a farm winery license from the New Jersey Division of Alcoholic Beverage Control, which allows it to produce up to 50,000 gallons of wine per year, operate up to 15 off-premises sales rooms, and ship up to 12 cases per year to consumers in-state or out-of-state. The winery is not a member of the Garden State Wine Growers Association, but is a member of the Outer Coastal Plain Vineyard Association. In April 2009, Turdo was profiled by stand-up comedian Jay Leno on The Tonight Show.

See also 
Alcohol laws of New Jersey
American wine
Judgment of Princeton
List of wineries, breweries, and distilleries in New Jersey
New Jersey Farm Winery Act
New Jersey Wine Industry Advisory Council
New Jersey wine

References

External links 
Outer Coastal Plain Vineyard Association

Lower Township, New Jersey
Wineries in New Jersey
Tourist attractions in Cape May County, New Jersey
2004 establishments in New Jersey